Warrington is a hamlet and civil parish in the unitary authority area of the City of Milton Keynes, Buckinghamshire, England, near Olney and on either side of the A509. It formed part of the parish of Olney until 1866. At the 2011 Census the population of the hamlet was included in the civil parish of Lavendon.

The hamlet name is an Old English language word that means 'Wærheard's estate'. It was recorded in the Domesday Book in 1086 as Wardintone.

The hamlet is confused occasionally with Warrington, the town in Cheshire.

It is the most northerly civil parish in the Milton Keynes UA, of Buckinghamshire and of the South East England Region.

References

External links

 map of the parish from MKWEB

Hamlets in Buckinghamshire
Areas of Milton Keynes
Civil parishes in Buckinghamshire